Yehya Ablikim (born 10 October 1988) is a Chinese footballer.

Club career
Yehya played for China League Two club Xinjiang Sport Lottery between 2006 and 2008. He joined Chinese Super League side Shenzhen Ruby along with his teammate Abduwali Ablet and Dilmurat Batur on 18 March 2011. He made his senior debut on 15 April 2011 in a 2–0 away defeat against Shanghai Shenhua, coming on as a substitute for Li Yang in the 72nd minute. He gradually became the starter of the team and scored his first Super League goal on 28 September 2011, which ensured Shenzhen tied with Liaoning Whowin 1–1. Yehya gained 22 league appearances in the 2011 season, however, Shenzhen Ruby relegated to the second tier by finishing the last place of the league. 

Yehya transferred to China League One side Xinjiang Tianshan Leopard in February 2014.

Career statistics 
Statistics accurate as of match played 31 December 2020.

References

External links
 

1988 births
Living people
People from Kashgar
Chinese footballers
Uyghur sportspeople
Chinese people of Uyghur descent
Footballers from Xinjiang
Association football midfielders
Shenzhen F.C. players
Xinjiang Tianshan Leopard F.C. players
Chinese Super League players
China League One players